Unió Esportiva Santboiana is a Spanish rugby union club. The club was established in 1921 and currently competes in the División de Honor de Rugby competition, the highest level of Spanish club  rugby. The club are based in Sant Boi de Llobregat in Catalonia, considered to be one of the capitals of Spanish rugby. Santboiana play in blue and white colours. The team have in the past won both the Spanish League and the Copa del Rey de Rugby as well as the Copa de Catalunya and Copa Ibèrica. They were champions of Spain in the 2005-06 season.

Santboiana are the former club of Sant Boi de Llobregat native Oriol Ripol, who is among Spain's most successful rugby players. He played professionally for Sale Sharks, in England's Guinness Premiership.

Honours
División de Honor: 7
Champions: 1983–84, 1986–87, 1988–89, 1995–96, 1996–97, 2004–05, 2005–06
Copa del Rey: 12
Champions: 1931, 1933, 1943, 1948, 1958, 1959, 1960, 1961, 1962, 1989, 2000, 2017
Copa Ibérica: 4
Champions: 1987, 1989, 2005, 2006
Copa Pirineos: 2
Champions: 1960, 1961
 Copa de Catalunya: 17
 Champions:  1923, 1931, 1933, 1934, 1935, 1943, 1944, 1945, 1956, 1959, 1995, 1996, 1997, 1998, 1999, 2000, 2005

Season by season

46 seasons in División de Honor

Squad 2014–15

International honours
  Víctor Acevedo
  Sergi Guerrero
  Marc Puigbert
  Víctor Marlet
  Juan Severino
  Mario Sagario
  Pablo Llorens
  Víctor Gallego
  Vicenç Lazaro
  Leonardo Pereira
  Jonathan Phipps

Other notable players
  Grant Polson (former player from Otago and Manawatu in Air New Zealand NPC)
  Isaac Thompson (signs from Manawatu in Air New Zealand NPC)
  Juan Pablo Socino (international Argentina U20)
  Isaac Richmond (international with English Counties)
  Pablo Llorens (international with Chile)
  Doug Tietjens (Former player from Otago and Manawatu in ITM CUP)
  Arnaud Astruc (Former player from USAP ESPOIR)

Ground 
UE Santboiana plays its home matches at Estadi Baldiri Aleu, which has a capacity of 4,000 spectators.

See also
 Rugby union in Spain

External links
 Official website
 Catalan Rugby website

Sant Boi de Llobregat
Rugby union teams in Catalonia
Rugby clubs established in 1921
1921 establishments in Spain